is a 1984 Japanese television drama series.

Cast
Shingo Tsurumi
Mari Ishihara
Kei Satō
Shigeru Muroi

References

1984 Japanese television series debuts
1984 Japanese television series endings
Japanese drama television series
TBS Television (Japan) dramas